Demirkonak, historically Barna, is a village in the Oğuzeli District, Gaziantep Province, Turkey. The village is inhabited by Turkmens from the Barak tribe and Abdals of the Kurular tribe.

References

Villages in Oğuzeli District